This is the complete list of Asian Games medalists in diving from 1951 to 2018.

Men

1 m springboard

3 m springboard

10 m platform

Synchronized 3 m springboard

Synchronized 10 m platform

Team

Women

1 m springboard

3 m springboard

10 m platform

Synchronized 3 m springboard

Synchronized 10 m platform

Team

References

 Medalists from previous Asian Games – Diving

External links
 Medalists from previous Asian Games – Men – Individual
 Medalists from previous Asian Games – Men – Synchro
 Medalists from previous Asian Games – Women – Individual
 Medalists from previous Asian Games – Women – Synchro

Diving
medalists

Lists of acrobatic divers